"Pray for Villains" is a song by American heavy metal band DevilDriver. It is the first single and first track from the band's fourth studio album, Pray for Villains.

Track listing

Digital single
 "Pray for Villains" – 4:04

Personnel

Dez Fafara – vocals
John Boecklin – drums
Jon Miller – bass
Mike Spreitzer – lead guitar
Jeff Kendrick – rhythm guitar
Logan Mader – producer

2009 singles
DevilDriver songs
2009 songs
Roadrunner Records singles